BC Mures finished the 2007–2008 half season in 8th place with a record of 7 wins and 6 losses. The team had the best offense in the Romanian first division with 1163 points (89,46 points/game), but also held the worst defense record with 1164 (89,53 points/game). Midway through the season,   Troy Selvey and  Jon Clark were waived by the management, even though both players were loved by the fans of BC Mures. To replace these players, management signed two players from the United States: Louis Truscott a 29-year-old, 200 cm and Frank Edward Russell, a  24-year-old, 211 cm center. Jay Anderson, the forward who was injured in the team's first game, missed the entire season and was replaced by Luke McKenna.
BC Mures finished the regular season in 8th place with a record of 15 wins and 11 losses. The team led in points scored, but also in points conceded.

In the first round of the playoffs, BC Mures were paired against league leaders Asesoft Ploiesti. After losing the first away game by a narrow margin, they were defeated on their home court in an elimination game. Playing for the 5-8th place with  playmaker JuJuan Cooley out, the team did not get another win, cementing their position as eighth in the league.

Major Squad changes after end of season

The Romanian Basketball Federation decided to increase the number of participants for the 08–09 season from 14 clubs to 16 clubs. In this case none of the clubs that played in the last season relegated to div. 2. CS Energia Rovinari and CSS ``U`` Craiova are the two new summer clubs that will complete the Romanian Basketball Division A team list. After the folding of the Rm.Valcea club there were only 15 teams left to start the championship race.

2007–2008 squad changes

In
  Jon Clark – signed from RSV Eintracht Stahnsdorf 
  Biro Ferenc – signed from Gaz Metan Medias 
  Luke Mckenna – signed for the first half of the season (extended for the season)
  Louis Truscott – signed for the second half of the season from
  Frank Edward Russell – signed for the second half of the season from Rutgers Scarlet Knights
Out
  George Trif – signed to CSM Oradea
  Troy Selvey – waived in December 2007 (half season)
  Jon Clark – waived in December 2007 (half season)

2007–2008 roster

Pre-season

Bc Mures played 4 games with Romanian teams and participated at an international friendly Cup in Hungary "Gocsej Cup". For details click the main article above.
 Bc Mures – CSU Sibiu 79-90 photo gallery 
 Bc Mures – Gaz Metan Medias 76-80 
 Bc Mures – Romanian National Team 80-79 photo gallery
 Bc Mures – CSU Brasov 69-81
Gocsej Cup,  Zalaegerszeg sept. 20-23
  Zalaegerszeg KK – Bc Mures 95–67
  Dombovar KC – Bc Mures 102–90
  Falco KC Szombathely – Bc Mures 110–102
  MAFC Újbuda – Bc Mures 71–75

2007–2008 Romanian Cup

 Bc Mures – Rapid Bucuresti (1st leg) 74-69 photo gallery 
 Rapid Bucuresti – Bc Mures (2nd leg) 84-64 (eliminated)

2007–2008 regular season

 Leonardo Oradea – Bc Mures 87-90 (OT)                            game summary (RO) box score photos
 Bc Mures – Elba Timisoara 79-78 game summary (RO)  box score photos 
 U Mobitelco Cluj – Bc Mures 106-92 game summary (RO)  box score
 Gaz Metan Medias – Bc Mures 101-85 game summary (RO)  box score
 Bc Mures – Bc Targoviste 85-76 game summary (RO)  box score photos 
 CSU Cuadripol Brasov – Bc Mures 85-90 game summary (RO)  box score
 Bc Mures – Dinamo Bucuresti  100-108
 CS Otopeni – Bc Mures 97-91
 Bc Mures – CSU Asesoft Ploiesti 77-81
 Bc Mures – BC Ramnicu Valcea 97-84
 Bc Mures – BCM Arges Pitesti 113-104 (OT)
 Bc Mures – Rapid Bucuresti 91-73
 CSU Atlassib Sibiu – Bc Mures 84-73
2nd half-season
 Bc Mures – Leonardo Oradea 90-73 (McKenna 20pts, 9reb; Truscott 18pts, 10reb; Cooley 12pts, 12as)
 Elba Timișoara – Bc Mures 72-71 (Truscott 18pts, 10reb; Mckenna 16pts, 12reb; McCullough 15pts)
 Bc Mures – U Mobitelco Cluj 78-76 (Truscott 23pts, 9reb; McCullogh 21pts; Cooley 9pts, 5as)
 Bc Mures – Gaz Metan Medias 105-94 (McCullogh 35pts; Cooley 22pts, 10as, 5steals; Truscott 21pts, McKenna 15pts, 11reb)
 Bc Targoviste – Bc Mures 79-92
 Bc Mures – CSU Cuadripol Brasov 127-79 
 CS Dinamo – Gealan București – BC Mureş Târgu Mureş 88–82
 Bc Mures – CS Otopeni 93–85
 CSU Asesoft Ploiesti – Bc Mures 96–69 
 BCM Arges Pitesti – Bc Mures 96–83 
 BC Ramnicu Valcea – Bc Mures 97–100
 Rapid Bucuresti – Bc Mures 101–83 
 Bc Mures – CSU Atlassib Sibiu 79–75 

Playoffs
First Round: 
CSU Asesoft Ploiesti – Bc Mures 88–80
Bc Mures- CSU Asesoft Ploiesti 78–85

Standings after the regular season
(as of 17 Feb. 2008)

References

2007–08 in Romanian basketball
2007–08 in European basketball by club